Erin Molan (born 24 August 1984) is an Australian television sports presenter.

She is currently a Primetime Contributor on Sky News Australia, radio presenter on 2Day FM and columnist on The Daily Telegraph.

Molan previously worked with the Nine Network where she was part of Nine's Wide World of Sports for their NRL coverage and from 2019 their tennis coverage, where she hosted the secondary broadcast for channel 9Gem of the Australian Open. Molan was also Friday and Saturday sports presenter on Nine News Sydney and the host of The Sunday Footy Show and former host of The NRL Footy Show.

Early life 
Molan was born in Canberra and raised in Jakarta, Indonesia. She attended 16 different schools due to her parents moving regularly in support of her father's career in the Australian Army.

Molan is the daughter of Major General Jim Molan, a former Australian Army officer who gained notoriety as deputy chief of staff for operations of the Multinational Force in Iraq during the Iraq War and replaced Arthur Sinodinos as a Liberal Senator for New South Wales in 2019.

Career
Molan's first job in media was in Canberra in community television. She then gained a job for WIN Television as a reporter and presenter and moved to Sydney in 2010 to work for the Nine Network.

In 2012, she joined The NRL Footy Show on a regular basis, appearing mainly on the "League of their Own" segment as well as being their roving reporter.

In 2014, she has become a permanent co-host of the program working alongside Paul Vautin, Darryl Brohman, Beau Ryan, and former test cricketer Michael Slater. Molan has also appeared on The Sunday Footy Show as a regular since 2012, mainly doing the "Around the Grounds" segment reporting.

In 2016, Molan was appointed host of The NRL Rookie, which aired on 9Go!.

Molan has previously been a fill in sport presenter on Nine News and Today. From December 2016, she was made permanent Friday and Saturday sport presenter on Nine News Sydney replacing Yvonne Sampson who moved to Fox Sports.

It was announced on 3 October 2018 that, after 24 years, The NRL Footy Show would be axed following the worst slide in ratings in the shows history.

In December 2021, Molan resigned from the Nine Network to join Sky News Australia as a Primetime Contributor.

Radio 
In November 2020, Southern Cross Austereo announced that Molan, Dave Hughes and Ed Kavalee would replace Jamie Angel to host The 2Day FM Morning Crew with Hughesy, Ed and Erin Molan from Monday, 18 January 2021. A one-hour highlights package will air nationally at 6pm across the Hit Network.

Controversies 
Molan hosted Nine's Wide World of Sports coverage of the 2017 Fast5 Netball World Series. In May 2017, in the aftermath of domestic violence charges against Parramatta player Semi Radradra being dropped, Molan was publicly slammed by a small number of fans and by sections of the media for supposedly painting Radradra as being guilty and not giving the player the presumption of innocence when the allegations were first aired. Molan was asked by fans and the media to make a public apology to Radradra but no apology was forthcoming; Molan had publicly stated that Radradra deserved the presumption of innocence, and rather than being specific about his case, her comments were about what the NRL's stance ought to be in the event of domestic violence being found proven against any player, regardless of calibre.

From 2018, she became the sole host of The NRL Footy Show as well as hosting The Sunday Footy Show. In August 2018, Molan and The Sunday Footy Show issued former NRL player Dave Taylor with an apology after being accused of fat shaming the player during a video segment.

In June 2020, Molan was criticized for mocking the name of Tongan Rugby League player Haumole Olakau'atu on the 2GB radio program The Continuous Call. Molan alleges that her nonsensical imitation of Olakau'atu's name was in reference to a previous discussion between the radio hosts where they grappled with how to correctly pronounce Pacific Islander names. Molan left the program at the end of the 2020 season. In August 2022, Molan won a legal case against Daily Mail Australia which she claimed had defamed her by publishing reports about this matter.

Personal life
In April 2017, Molan announced on The NRL Footy Show that she was engaged to partner Sean Ogilvy.

In December 2017, Molan announced on Nine News Sydney that she was expecting her first child. In 2018, Molan gave birth to a baby girl.

She is a supporter of Liverpool F.C.

In September 2021, she announced she had split from her fiance Sean Ogilvy.

In August 2022, she revealed she had used a fake ID to get into nightclubs when she was 16.

See also

List of Nine Network presenters

References

External links

 
 

1984 births
Living people
Australian rugby league commentators
Nine's Wide World of Sport
People from Canberra
Nine News presenters